Reportage Press was a publishing house specialising in "books on foreign affairs or set in foreign countries, or just books written from a stranger's view."

In reaction to the lack of quality books on foreign affairs, Reportage Press was established in 2007 by two former journalists: Charlotte Eagar, a foreign correspondent who has covered conflicts such as the Iraq and Balkan wars; and Rosie Whitehouse, a former BBC journalist. They believe these books are newsworthy and want to publish books "that mainstream houses shun in favour of ghosted showbiz autobiographies and TV spin-offs".

At the beginning of 2008, Reportage was named as one of the 'New lists to watch' by The Bookseller. All the titles published have received media coverage, something Eager and Whitehouse put down to "the newsworthy content, and their ability to get books out quickly."

Reportage Press books also have a charitable aspect: a percentage of the profits go towards a charity related to the book. For example, a percentage of profits from Denise Affonço's To The End Of Hell go to the Documentation Centre of Cambodia (DC-Cam), where a scholarship has been set up in the name of Denise Affonço's nine-year-old daughter Jeannie, who starved to death in 1976 under the Khmer Rouge regime.

Authors 
Denise Affonço
Tom Blass
Rob Crilly
Magdalene de Lancey
Charlotte Eagar
Sergei Golitsyn
Tim Judah
Justin Kerr-Smiley
John Langdon-Davies
Adam LeBor
Joris Luyendijk
David Charles Manners
Daniela Norris
Christopher Othen
Oliver Poole
Révérien Rurangwa
William Stirling
Reginald Thompson
Annabel Venning
Vitali Vitaliev
Rosie Whitehouse
Ros Wynne-Jones

References

External links
Reportage Press Website

Book publishing companies of the United Kingdom
Publishing companies established in 2007